The Missile Troops and Artillery (MT & A), ( – РВиА) are a Combat Arm of the Russian Ground Forces, They are the primary means of providing fire on the enemy during combined-arms operations.
They are designed to perform the following main tasks:

 achieving and keeping fire superiority over the enemy;
 defeat of its means of nuclear attack, manpower, weapons, military and special equipment;
 disruption of troops and weapons’ control systems, reconnaissance and electronic warfare;
 destruction of long-term defence installations and other infrastructure;
 disruption of operational and military logistics;
 weakening and isolation of the second echelons and reserves of the enemy;
 destruction of tanks and other armoured vehicles of the enemy breaking into the depth of defence;
 cover of open flanks and junctions;
 participation in destruction of aircraft and amphibious assault forces of the enemy;
 remote mining of areas and facilities;
 light support of night actions of troops;
 smoke-screening, blinding of enemy targets;
 distribution of propaganda materials, etc.
 
Organisationally the MT & A consist of missile, rocket, artillery brigades, including high-power mixed, artillery battalions, rocket artillery regiments, separate reconnaissance battalions, as well as artillery of combined-arms brigades and military bases.

Further development and increase of combat capabilities of the MT & A of the GF are put into life by means of creating reconnaissance-fire units, including on interim basis, ensuring defeat of targets in real time, equipment of formations and units of the MT & A with high-precision weapons, increasing of firing range and power of the ammunition used, and automation of processes for preparation and firing.

Amongst the oldest combat branches of the Ground Forces with a history dating to 1392, its service anniversary is marked on Missile Troops and Artillery Day, November 27, honoring the gunners and MRL operators who in 1942 fired the first shots of the artillery counterattacks during the long Battle of Stalingrad against the German Sixth Army.

Current organization 
Formerly organized into separate divisions today the MT&A are organized into one division, the 18th Machine Gun Artillery Division in the Eastern Military District, a number of divisional artillery (self-propelled gun and towed gun) regiments of motor rifle and tank divisions and independent brigades and regiments of field artillery (including MRL and tactical missile brigades). 

There are also a number of artillery battalions under regiments and brigades.

Divisional artillery regiments 
 99th Pomerania Guards Self-Propelled Regiment under the 3rd MRD, Boguchar
 275th Self-Propelled Artillery Regiment under the 4th GTD, Naro-Fominsk
 147th Guards Self-Propelled Artillery Simferopol Regiment under the 2nd GMRD, Kalininets
 856th Guards Self-Propelled Artillery Regiment under the 144th GMRD, Yelnya
 381st Guards Warsaw Artillery Regiment under the 150th MRD, Novocherkassk
 400th Transylvania Self-Propelled Artillery Regiment under the 90th GTD, Chebarkul 
 50th Guards Artillery Regiment (Training) under the 42nd GMRD, Khankala
 872nd Artillery Regiment (Training) under the 127th MRD, Sergeyevka
 46th Machinegun Artillery Regiment under the 18th MGAD, Lagunnoe
 49th Machinegun Artillery Regiment under the 18th MGAD, Goryachie Klyuchi

Independent brigades 
 28th Air Defense Rocket Brigade (Central Military District)
 38th Air Defense Rocket Brigade (Eastern Military District)
 45th Svir High-Power Artillery Brigade (Western Military District)
 77th Air Defense Rocket Brigade (Southern Military District)
 79th Guards Reactive Artillery Brigade (Western Military District)
 120th Guards Artillery Brigade
 202nd Air Defense Rocket Brigade (Western Military District)
 232th Guards Reactive Artillery Brigade (Central Military District)
 338th Guards Reactive Artillery Brigade (Eastern Military District)
 385th Guards Artillery Brigade (Central Military District)
 439th Guards Reactive Artillery Brigade (Southern Military District)

Commanders
Colonel-General Nikolai Dimidyuk (1991-1997) 
Colonel-General Mikhail Karatuev (1997-2001)
Colonel-General Vladimir Zarutsky (2001-2008)
Lieutenant-General Sergei Bogatinov (2009-2010)
Lieutenant-General Mikhail Matveyevsky (2010-present)

References

External links

Russian Ground Forces
Military of Russia